Sky Gate International Aviation was a charter airline based in Amman, Jordan., which was founded in 2003. In 2008, the airline was shut down.
Sky Gate International Aviation was on the list of air carriers banned in the European Union.

Fleet 
The Sky Gate International Aviation fleet included the following aircraft (as of 10 September 2008)

3 Lockheed L-1011-250 Tristar
1 Boeing 747-400

References

2008 disestablishments in Jordan
Defunct airlines of Jordan
Airlines established in 2003
Airlines disestablished in 2008
Jordanian companies established in 2003